Abu Reyan al-Zarkazi, also known as Abu Musa, is suspected of being an al-Qaeda operative by the Pakistani government. On February 18, 2010 Pakistan announced it had captured Zarkazi and two other al-Qaeda suspects in Karachi. The Pakistani newspaper Dawn describes Zarkazi as a "known associate of Osama bin Laden."

References

Living people
Al-Qaeda members
Year of birth missing (living people)